Malachi Tyrese Mthokozisi Napa (born 26 May 1999) is an English professional footballer who plays as a winger for Dartford on loan from National League club Wealdstone.

Club career
Napa was born in London and grew up in North Woolwich. He played youth football with Reading and Oxford United's Academy before signing his first professional contract with Oxford United in May 2017. After a loan period with Hampton & Richmond Borough, he made his senior Oxford debut as a 65th-minute substitute in an EFL Trophy win over Gillingham in December 2017, providing the assist for Alex Mowatt to score the injury-time winner. His league debut was also as a substitute, in a home victory over Milton Keynes Dons on 1 January 2018. His first start was in Karl Robinson's first match in charge, a televised 3–0 league defeat at Portsmouth on 25 March 2018.

In August 2018 he signed a new three-year contract with Oxford, and joined Macclesfield Town on loan until January 2019. After playing 22 games (in all competitions) at the start of the season, his appearances became less frequent under new manager Sol Campbell, and he returned to his parent club in early 2019 to recover from a virus.

On his return to the Oxford first team in an EFL Cup first-round match against Peterborough United on 13 August 2019, Napa suffered a broken leg.

On 2 October 2020 he went on a short-term loan to National League side Woking.

On 22 January 2021, Napa returned to Woking on a one-month loan, following a prolonged injury lay-off. On 25 March 2021, the loan was made permanent, with Napa signing a deal until the end of the 2020–21 campaign.

On 13 August 2021, following his release from Woking, Napa opted to join Isthmian League North Division side Maldon & Tiptree and went onto score on his debut during a 7–0 victory over Romford, a day later.

On 15 July 2022, Napa agreed to return to the National League to join Wealdstone following a successful trial period.

On 9 December 2022, Napa joined Dartford on an initial one-month loan.

Personal life
Napa is of Zimbabwean Shona and South African descent.

Career statistics

References

External links 
 

1999 births
Living people
Footballers from the London Borough of Newham
English footballers
English people of Zimbabwean descent
English sportspeople of African descent
English sportspeople of South African descent
Association football midfielders
English Football League players
Oxford United F.C. players
North Leigh F.C. players
Hampton & Richmond Borough F.C. players
Macclesfield Town F.C. players
Woking F.C. players
Maldon & Tiptree F.C. players
Wealdstone F.C. players
Dartford F.C. players